Joseph Grimmond (1843 – 27 November 1924) was a gold miner and politician from the West Coast, New Zealand. He was mayor of Ross for many years, represented the Hokitika electorate in the House of Representatives for one term, and was later called to the Legislative Council.

Early life
Grimmond was born in 1843 in Drogheda, Ireland, the son of James Grimmond. He obtained his education at the Drogheda Blue Coat school and trained as an engineer.

He emigrated to Melbourne in 1859 on the Eagle and joined the gold rush. He came to New Zealand in 1861 and continued working on various gold fields, and came to the West Coast in 1865. He became involved in politics, and was a member of Westland County for many years, including five as its chairman. He was mayor of Ross for 13 years.

Later life

 
He represented the Hokitika electorate in the House of Representatives from 1887 to 1890, when he was defeated for Westland by Richard Seddon.

She suffered increasing paralysis and died in November 1895. On 5 May 1898, he married Margaret (Maggie) Isabella Macfarlane, the eldest daughter of Hokitika's resident magistrate, Duncan Macfarlane.

He was appointed to the Legislative Council in 1918 and served until his death. He remained active until old age and in 1923 at the age of 80, he led a party of parliamentarians up the Franz Josef Glacier. He died suddenly in Ross on 27 November 1924. He was survived by his second wife.

References

1843 births
1924 deaths
Members of the New Zealand House of Representatives
Members of the New Zealand Legislative Council
People from the West Coast, New Zealand
New Zealand gold prospectors
Unsuccessful candidates in the 1890 New Zealand general election
Unsuccessful candidates in the 1896 New Zealand general election
New Zealand MPs for South Island electorates
People from Drogheda
Irish emigrants to New Zealand (before 1923)
19th-century New Zealand politicians
People of the West Coast Gold Rush
Mayors of places in the West Coast, New Zealand